"Driving Wheel", sometimes recorded as "Lost My Driving Wheel", is a song written by British-born Canadian folk singer David Wiffen. The song was popularized by Tom Rush, and has been performed and recorded by many well-known musicians.

History
Wiffen included "Driving Wheel" on his 1971 self-titled album which was released on Fantasy Records. The album received spotty promotion, and the song was not widely known until it appeared on Tom Rush's self-titled album in 1970. Soon after it was recorded  by Whitney Sunday.

"Driving Wheel" was included on Roger McGuinn's self-titled 1973 album, released by Columbia Records.  It was also recorded by the Cowboy Junkies and released in several forms.

Years later, in 2013, Americana singer David Bromberg included the song on his album Only Slightly Mad. Many musicians also continue to include the song in their live sets.

References

1971 songs